Small Talk is the debut album by British pop band Twenty Twenty. It was released for pre-order on 7 March 2011 before its general release on 25 April 2011. It charted at 26 in the UK on 9 May 2011. The first single from the album was Love to Life which peaked at number 60 in the UK when released on 17 April 2011.

Track listing

Personnel
 Sam Halliday - lead vocals, lead guitar
 Jack Halliday - bass guitar, backing vocals
 Sonny Watson-Lang - drums, backing vocals

Chart performance

References

2011 debut albums
Twenty Twenty (band) albums